The Mullen Fire is a wildfire that burned over ,  west of Laramie, Wyoming. The fire started on September 17, 2020 in the Savage Run Wilderness of Carbon County, and spread to Albany County. On September 30, it spread into Jackson County, Colorado. The cause is still under investigation. It is burning close to the Rob Roy Reservoir, and Platte River Wilderness.
On October 15, 2020, the fire was estimated to span 25 miles north to south, and 23 miles east to west. As of January 4, 2021, the fire is 97% contained.

Gallery

Status
The fire jumped into Colorado on September 30. At that time the fire was initially believed to be human-caused, however details remained limited as it was early into the investigation.  
On January 4, 2021, the fire was 97 percent contained. Cooler temperatures and precipitation were able to slow the fire's growth. 22 structures had been lost.

References

2020 wildfires in the United States
Wildfires in Wyoming
2020 in Wyoming